Juliana dos Reis de Freitas (born June 27, 1998) is a Brazilian female acrobatic gymnast. Along with her partner, Gabriel Ferreira Ioshida, she competed in the 2014 Acrobatic Gymnastics World Championships.

References

1998 births
Living people
Brazilian acrobatic gymnasts
Female acrobatic gymnasts